The 2014–15 Australian Athletics Championships was the 93rd edition of the national championship in outdoor track and field for Australia. It was held from 26–29 March 2015 at the Queensland Sport and Athletics Centre in Brisbane. It served as the selection meeting for Australia at the 2015 World Championships in Athletics. Distance events were held separately, with the 10,000 metres taking place at the Zatopek 10K on 11 December 2014 at Lakeside Stadium in Melbourne, the men's 5000 metres being held at the same location on 21 March 2015, and the women's 5000 m taking place at Sydney Olympic Park on 14 March 2015.

Medal summary

Men

Women

References

External links 
 Athletics Australia website

2015
Australian Athletics Championships
Australian Championships
Athletics Championships
Sports competitions in Brisbane
2010s in Brisbane